SS Sugar Transporter was the title of a cargo ship built by Hall, Russell & Company and launched on 21 November 1957. Its construction was sponsored by the wife of Mr. J. F. P. Tate, a director of Silvertown Services Shipping Company Ltd. In 1966, the ship's name was changed to Malmi under new owners from Helsinki, Finland. On 6 December 1979, during a voyage from Gdańsk, Poland to Koverhar, Malmi capsized and sank in the Baltic Sea, 40 nautical miles (46 miles; 74 km) northeast of Gotska Sandön, when her cargo of coke shifted in heavy weather.

References

1957 ships
Ships built in Aberdeen
Cargo ships of the United Kingdom
Maritime incidents in 1979
Shipwrecks in the Baltic Sea